Cecilia Chou Ting Ting (born 7 November 1987) is a Chilean female badminton player.

Achievements

BWF International Challenge/Series
Women's Singles

Women's Doubles

Mixed Doubles

 BWF International Challenge tournament
 BWF International Series tournament
 BWF Future Series tournament

References

External links
 

Living people
1987 births
Chilean female badminton players
Badminton players at the 2015 Pan American Games
South American Games bronze medalists for Chile
South American Games medalists in badminton
Competitors at the 2010 South American Games
Pan American Games competitors for Chile